The 2005–06 Northern Football League season was the 108th in the history of Northern Football League, a football competition in England.

Division One

Division One featured 18 clubs which competed in the division last season, along with three new clubs, promoted from Division Two:
 Newcastle Blue Star
 Washington Nissan, who also changed name to Sunderland Nissan
 West Allotment Celtic

Also, Newcastle Benfield Saints changed name to Newcastle Benfield (Bay Plastics).

League table

Division Two

Division Two featured 14 clubs which competed in the division last season, along with six new clubs.
 Clubs relegated from Division One:
 Consett
 Guisborough Town
 Peterlee Newtown
 Plus:
 Darlington Railway Athletic, joined from the Wearside Football League
 Ryton, joined from the Northern Football Alliance
 Spennymoor Town, new club formed by merger of Evenwood Town and folded Spennymoor United

League table

References

External links
 Northern Football League official site

Northern Football League seasons
9